Jigmechholing Gewog (Dzongkha: འཇིགས་མེད་ཆོས་གླིང་), also transliterated as Jigmecholing or Jigmechoeling and formerly known as Surey is a gewog (village block) of Sarpang District, Bhutan.

References 

Gewogs of Bhutan
Sarpang District